The 1997 IIHF European U18 Championship was the thirtieth playing of the IIHF European Junior Championships.

Group A
Played April 12 to the 20th, in Znojmo and Trebic, Czech Republic. Switzerland shocked everyone by opening the tournament with wins over the Czechs and the Russians.  Although they tired by the end of the tournament, their win over Slovakia assured them of their first (and only) medal in the European Juniors.

First round 
Group 1

Group 2

Final round
Championship round

7th place

Germany, losing the best of three series in overtime, was relegated to Group B for 1998.

Tournament Awards
Top Scorer  Marko Kauppinen (9 points)
Top Goalie: Mika Noronen
Top Defenceman:Jonas Elofsson
Top Forward: Michel Riesen

Kauppinen, a defenceman, set a record for the lowest point total to lead a tournament.

Group B 
Played March 21 to the 30th, in Maribor and Celje, Slovenia.

First round 
Group 1

Group 2

Final round
Championship round

7th place

Norway was promoted to Group A, and Slovenia was relegated to Group C, for 1998.

Group C 
Played March 12 to the 16th in Miercurea-Ciuc and Gheorgheni, Romania.

First round
Group 1

Group 2

Placing round 

Great Britain was promoted to Group B and the Netherlands was relegated to Group D, for 1998.

Group D
Played in Belgrade, Yugoslavia from March 4th to 9th. The hosts completely dominated, with forward Csaba Prokec scoring 29 points in their 5 games.

Yugoslavia was promoted to Group C for 1998.

References

Complete results

Junior
IIHF European Junior Championship tournament
Znojmo
Třebíč
IIHF European U18 Championship
Junior
International ice hockey competitions hosted by the Czech Republic
IIHF European U18 Championship
Sport in Maribor
Sport in Celje
International ice hockey competitions hosted by Slovenia
Junior
Miercurea Ciuc
International ice hockey competitions hosted by Romania
Junior
International ice hockey competitions hosted by Yugoslavia
1990s in Belgrade
International sports competitions in Belgrade
Junior
IIHF European U18 Championship